The Jharkhand Party (JP) is a political party in India formed in 1949 by Jaipal Singh Munda. The party grew out of the demand for a separate Jharkhand state. 

The Jharkhand Party participated in the Bihar Legislative Assembly elections of 1952, 1957, and 1962. For more than 15 years, the Jharkand Party was the only major opposition political party against the Indian National Congress in Bihar. In 1955, the Jharkhand Party submitted a memorandum for the creation of a separate state of Jharkhand to the States Reorganization Commission, but the state was not created for linguistic and economic reasons.

History
In 1936, Jaipal Singh Munda was approached by Chhotanagpur Unnati Samaj's leaders to be president of the organization. Singh changed the name of Chhotanagpur Unnati Samaj to Akhil Bhartiya Adivasi Mahasabha in 1939. Singh became president of Adivasi Mahasabha. At the Ramgarh session of Congress in 1940, he discussed with Subash Chandra Bose the need to form a separate Jharkhand state. Bose replied that such a request would affect the struggle for freedom. After the independence of India, the Adivasi Mahasabha re-emerged as the Jharkhand Party and it accommodated non-tribal people to achieve long-term goals. Singh is popularly known as "Marang Gomke" (meaning 'Great Leader') by the Adivasis of Chhotanagpur.

The party fared well in the 1952 elections, and got 34 out of 325 seats in Bihar Legislative Assembly, becoming a major opposition party.

The Jharkhand Party participated in the 1952 election and won 34 seats in the Bihar Legislative Assembly. In 1962, it won 20 seats. In 1955, the Jharkhand Party submitted a memorandum for creation of separate state to States Reorganization Commission, but the state was not created because the region had many languages and tribal languages were in the minority.

Jaipal Singh was disappointed by the declining popularity of his party and rejection of its demand for a separate Jharkhand. In 1963 the Jharkhand Party merged with Indian National Congress. The merger was quite unpopular within the party ranks, and a variety of splinter groups were formed, many of which claimed the name of the Jharkhand Party, such as the All India Jharkhand Party, the Hul Jharkhand Party, and the Rajya Hul Jharkhand Party.

In 1967, N.E. Horo became an MLA of the Jharkhand Party from Kolibera by election.

In 1971, the Jharkhand Party was reorganized by Bagun Sumrai, who was elected president. Horo became general secretary of the party.

On 12 March 1971, the Jharkhand Party arranged the Jharkhand-Mang diwas agitations in front of the parliament.

In 1975, N.E. Horo was elected president of the party and Noren Hansda was elected general secretary.

In 1990, N.E. Horo was elected president, working president Lal Ranvijay Nath Sahdeo, Ashok Bhagat General Secretary in byniel conference.

2005 Anosh ekka elected kolebira vidhansabha election and becoming the cabinet minister and also rural development and transport minister of Jharkhand State, Anosh Ekka elected president and Ashok Bhagat Principal general secretary in general conference.

On 8 January 2009, Jharkhand Party candidate Raja Peter defeated sitting Chief Minister of Jharkhand, Shibu Soren by over 9,000 votes in presidency of Anosh Ekka and Vice-president Ranvijay Nath Shahdeo. Shri Anosh Ekka is National president of Jharkhand Party, Shri Ashok Kumar Bhagat-Principal General Secretary, Shri Kiran Aind-Working President, Sri Ajit Kumar working president, Shri Rezi Dungdung-Vice President (ex-ADGP), Md Rizwan Ahmad-Vice President, Shri O.P Agrawal-Vice President, Miss Ireen Ekka -Youth President, Smt. Arpana Hans President of Mahilla wing and Shri Lal Kishore Das (Head-IT Cell) and Mr. Lokesh Chauhan-IT Cell In-Charge of Jharkhand Party.

References

Political parties established in 1949
Political parties in Jharkhand
1949 establishments in India